Fjærlandsfjorden is a fjord in Vestland county, Norway. It is a fjord arm that branches off the main Sognefjorden to the north, running through Sogndal Municipality. The Esefjorden and Vetlefjorden are two small fjord arms that branch off the Fjærdlandsfjorden. The head of the fjord is the only habitable area around the fjord. It is a flat river valley extending north of the fjord. The inner part of the fjord where the village of Fjærland is located is only accessible by boat or via long road tunnels through the surrounding mountains. The western end of the Frudal Tunnel sits very near the shore of the fjord.

Gallery

See also 
 List of Norwegian fjords

References 

Fjords of Vestland
Sogndal